Quinceañera (English title: Sweet 15) is a Mexican telenovela produced by Carla Estrada for Televisa in 1987. Quinceañera was the first telenovela to talk about substance abuse, date rape and gangs, and is considered to be the first telenovela made in Mexico for teenagers.

Quinceañera was named by the Associated Press as one of the 10 most influential telenovelas ever to air in Latin America, and Univision tlnovelas viewers named it one of their all-time favorite Mexican telenovelas. In 2010, Quinceañera was placed #7 on the People en Español's "20 Best Telenovelas" list, and in 2012, Terra named it as one of the 50 best telenovelas of all-time.

Adela Noriega, Thalía, Ernesto Laguardia and Rafael Rojas starred as protagonists, while Sebastián Ligarde and Nailea Norvind starred as antagonists.

Plot
Maricruz (Adela Noriega) and Beatriz (Thalía) are classmates and best friends. Maricruz is from a working-class family, while Beatriz's is very wealthy. They are both 14 and excited about their quinceañera parties and becoming women.

Mechanic's apprentice Pancho (Ernesto Laguardia) and gang tough Memo (Sebastian Ligarde) are attracted to Maricruz. Maricruz is immediately disgusted by Memo and eventually accepts Pancho's love. Memo attacks Maricruz; she faints before he can rape her, but he lets her believe he did rape her. She feels violated, defiled, and unworthy of Pancho and believes he won't want her now.

At the same time, Maricruz's brother Gerardo (Rafael Rojas) starts dating Beatriz when their mother pressures her children to raise their social class. When Beatriz becomes pregnant, her family supports her after their initial horror. Both girls realize that the passage to womanhood was not what they expected.

Cast

 Adela Noriega as Maricruz Fernández Sarcoser
 Thalía as Beatriz Villanueva Contreras
 Ernesto Laguardia as Pancho
 Armando Araiza as Chato
 Julieta Egurrola as Carmen Sarcoser de Fernández
 Sebastian Ligarde as Guillermo "Memo" López
 Fernando Ciangherotti as Sergio Iturralde Contreras
 Nailea Norvind as Leonor Gutiérrez
 Rafael Rojas as Gerardo Fernández Sarcoser
 Blanca Sánchez as Ana María Contreras de Villanueva
 Omar Fierro as Arturo
 Inés Morales as Elvira Contreras Vda. de Iturralde
 Maricarmen Vela as Enriqueta Solórzano
 Roberto Ballesteros as Antonio
 Karen Sentíes as Teresa
 Jorge Lavat as Roberto Villanueva
 Julieta Bracho as Srta. Palmira
 Silvia Caos as Consuelo
 René Muñoz as Timoteo "Timo"
 Abraham Méndez as Ernesto
 Rosario Granados as Rosalía Vda. de Contreras
 Carlos Espejel as Indalecio "Reintegro"
 Luis Bayardo as Ramón Fernández
 Roberto Carrera as Joaquín
 Alejandra Gollas as Adriana Fernández Sarcoser
 Margarita Sanz as Eduviges Sarcoser
 Ana Bertha Espín as Estela
 Cristopher Lago as Carlitos
 Lucero Lander as Alicia
 Meche Barba as Lupe
 Marta Aura as Gertrudis
 Ricardo D'loera as Lic. Espinoza
 Alicia Montoya as Licha
 Lucha Moreno as Virginia Campos
 Ana Silvia Garza as Srta. Sofía
 Rolando de Castro Sr. as Lic. de la Barrera
 Ana María Aguirre as Cristina
 Pancho Muller as Andrés "Toluco" López
 Gabriel Fernandez as El Chamo
 Enrique Gilabert as Sr. Villarreal
 Alejandro Montoya as Joaquín
 Rosa Elena Díaz as Mother Esperanza
 Keiko as Orca

Soundtrack

Track listing 
 Timbiriche – "Quinceañera (instrumental)"
 Pandora – "Ella Se Llenó de Amor"
 Bryan Adams – "Native Son"
 Vangelis – "To the Unknown Man"
 Manuel Mijares – "El Rey de la Noche (instrumental)"
 Miguel Mateos – "Cuando Seas Grande"
 Michael Jackson – "Bad"
 Luis Miguel – "Cuando calienta el sol (instrumental)"
 Stevie Wonder – "I Just Called to Say I Love You (instrumental)"
 Pink Floyd – "Terminal Frost (instrumental)"
 Pandora – "Tu Cariño"
 Miguel Mateos – "Cuando Seas Grande"
 W.A.S.P. - "Wild Child"

Awards

Other versions
 Televisa made a remake of Quinceañera named Primer amor, a mil por hora, in 2000 stars Anahí and Ana Layevska and a second remake, Miss XV, in 2012 stars by Paulina Goto and Natasha Dupeyrón.

References

External links
 Quinceañera at univision.com
 

1987 telenovelas
Mexican telenovelas
Televisa telenovelas
1987 Mexican television series debuts
1988 Mexican television series endings
Spanish-language telenovelas
Television shows set in Mexico City